Helen Nakimuli (born 2 July 1985) is a Ugandan politician and legislator, volleyball player, member of the eleventh Parliament of Uganda for Kalangala District. She is a member of the National Unity Platform (NUP).

Education and background 
Nakimuli was born in Lukuba village, Kyamuswa sub-county in Kalangala to an Orthodox priest, Rev. Father Christopher Walusimbi and Maria Nalwanga Walusimbi a former Kalangala District councillor for Kyamuswa and Bubeke. Nakimuli started her education at Bukasa Primary school, Hormisdallen Primary School in Bweyogerere in Wakiso , Our Lady of Good Counsel in Gayaza for her Ordinary Level, St. Augustine secondary school in Wakiso for her Advanced level before joining Makerere University.

Political career 
Nakimuli's political career begun at St. Augustine secondary school as a head girl. She defeated  Aidah Nabayiga to be become the member of parliament for Kalangala District

Other works 
Nakimuli has been a volleyball player since 1998. She was the captain of the ladies’ volleyball team that went for East Africa Parliamentary Games in Arusha, Tanzania. She is a member of the COBAP Volleyball Club. She helped windows of Kalangala to get lawyers when other people want to take their late husbands' property. Nakimuli donated relief which included food, soap among other things to the elderly people in Kalangala District. Nakimuli gave relief to the people of whose houses were burnt. Nakimuli appealed to the State minister for microfinance, Haruna Kyeyune Kasolo to include the island Districts of Buvuma and Namayingo to the list of Emyooga funds

Awards 
Nakimuli was given an ecclesial medal by The Orthodox Pope and Patriarch of Alexandria and all Africa, His Divine Beatitude Theodore II in recognition of her exemplary service to the Orthodox Church, Uganda and humanity.

See also 

 List of members of the eleventh Parliament of Uganda
 Shamim Malende
 Parliament of Uganda
 National Unity Platform (NUP)

References 

21st-century Ugandan politicians
21st-century Ugandan women politicians
National Unity Platform politicians
Living people
Members of the Parliament of Uganda
Women members of the Parliament of Uganda
1985 births